Premios Ignotus are annual Spanish literary awards that were created in 1991 by the Asociación Española de Fantasía, Ciencia Ficción y Terror (AEFCFT, translation: Spanish Association of Fantasy, Science Fiction and Horror). The awards, which are in the genres of science fiction and fantasy, are voted on by members of HispaCon, the national science fiction convention of Spain. The method appears to be very similar to the Hugo Awards.

Award winners by category

Category: Novel

Category: Anthology

Category: Foreign Novel

Category: Foreign Short Story

References

External links
 Official web site
 Science Fiction Awards Database: Ignotus Awards

Fantasy awards
Spanish science fiction awards
Horror fiction awards